Manamagal is a 1951 Indian Tamil-language drama film, directed and produced by N. S. Krishnan. The film stars Padmini, Lalitha, S. V. Sahasranamam and T. S. Balaiah in lead roles. It is based on the Malayalam play Suprabha by playwright Munshi Paramu Pillai. The film was dubbed into Telugu as Pelli Kuthuru.

Plot

Mei Kandar runs an ashram called Thiruvalluvar ashram for poor kids, providing them education and other skills for their future. On one occasion, his students rescue Chandra, a poor widowed pregnant woman abandoned by her remarried husband Bagavathar (Music Teacher). Chandra gives birth to a boy baby who later grows up in the ashram. Meanwhile, abandoning his first wife, Bagavathar moves to teach music to a rich person's daughter Kumari. But she  is already engaged to S. V. Sahasranamam, son of her father's family friend. Kumari's father also has an accountant who married a young girl Vijaya. Kumari's father is the one who sponsors the ashram run by N. S. Krishnan. After the arrival of Chandra, the ashram goes under more progressive changes.

Meanwhile, Bagavathar, teaching music has an eye on Kumari to marry her as second wife by hiding his previous life. Bagavathar also tries to seduce the accountant's wife Vijaya who is distressed due to the age difference of her husband. Varathan, a friend of Bagavathar moving along with him from his days with Chandra, gives suggestions to cheat and marry Kumari  avoiding Sahasranamam. Kumari "to-be husband" S. V. Sahasranamam is away in England for his Barrister studies and returns to her home. Knowing Bagavathar's intentions when he is trying to propose to Kumari, he clashes with Bagavathar earning Kumari's ire. Kumari, out of anger, decides to marry Bagavathar. Taking a twist in the plot, circumstances force her to marry him. Situations lead to Madhuram son's death where Kumari  learns about Bagavathar. Kumari's father learns about Bagavathar and his affairs seeing his accountant roaming mad in Mahabalipuram. Meanwhile, Kumari donates all her wealth to the ashram as Bagavathar and her illicit partner, his friend lavishly spend money. Knowing about her donations to the ashram, Kumari is kidnapped to force her to give her property to the antagonists. Leading to a climax — the heroine discards her namesake husband and in a reformative gesture marries her boyfriend Sahasranamam.

Cast
Cast according to the opening credits of the film

Male cast
 N. S. Krishnan as Meikandar
 S. V. Sahasranamam as Chandran
 T. S. Balaiah as Balu
 T. S. Durairaj as Varadan
 Pulimootai Ramasami
 Azhwar Kuppusami
 D. Balasubramanyam as Parandhaman
 C. S. Pandian
 T. V. Radhakrishnan as Student
 K. A. Thangavelu as Kumari's Servant
 M. M. Jayasakthivel
 P. V. Chinnasami
 K. M. Goureesam Pillai
 K. Chandrasekharan
 V. Narayanan
 Kandasami Pillai

Female cast
 T. A. Mathuram as Radhai
 Lalitha as Vijaya
 Padmini as Kumari
 Gandhimathi as Student
 Nagarathnam
 Krishnaveni
 Jayalakshmi
 Kusalakumari
 Pattammal
 Ragini
 Thangam
 Suryakumari
 Kamala
 Leela
 P. G. Parvathi

Production

Based on a popular Malayalam play Suprabha by playwright Munshi Paramu Pillai, Manamagal had dialogue by Mu. Karunanidhi. N. S. Krishnan directed the film, besides playing a social reformer. The title refers to the heroine (Padmini) who chooses to remain a bride and never a wife because of the lecherous nature of her husband (T. S. Balaiah). Krishnan decided to adapt the play into a film after being impressed by the plotline. Krishnan met Munshi and paid him Rs. 500 for the rights.

Krishnan chosen M. Karunanidhi to write the dialogues. The film was launched at Newton Studios at 31 December 1950. A. Bhimsingh who was one of the assistant directors in the film was assigned the job to dub the film in Telugu. Some scenes were shot in Telugu to make it look like a straight Telugu film. According to film producer and writer G. Dhananjayan, S. S. Rajendran made his acting debut with this film in a role of a beggar, but his portions were edited out the film by the Censor Board as they felt his dialogues were too revolutionary. Dhananjayan also noted that Rajendran's name still appears in the credits, though there are no scenes featuring him. The film marked the acting debut of Padmini as a lead actress. K. A. Thangavelu, Kaka Radhakrishnan did a minor role in the film. In the film, Krishnan introduced a technical innovation by showing the behind-the-screen-technicians on screen.

Soundtrack
The music was composed by C. R. Subburaman.

The song "Ellam Inbamaayam" was well received and catapulted its singer M. L. Vasanthakumari to fame. This song was composed based on six ragas of Carnatic music. The song "Ellam Inbamayam", based on the Kalyani raga, starts with Simhendramadhyamam and having a ragamalika suite of Mohanam, Hindolam and Darbar. The song "Chinnanchiru Kiliiye" based on the poem by Subramaniya Bharati was sung by V. N. Sundaram. This song is based on Kapi raga. Originally, GNB was supposed to sing this song with Vasanthakumari. GNB had some rehearsals too, when T. R. Balu protested that GNB should not sing for the film, he opted out.

Pelli Kuthuru Telugu songs

Release
Manamagal became a commercial success at box office. The Malayalam play which was the base was thematically similar to Hindi film Duniya Na Maane by V. Shantaram.

The film received positive reviews for its bold theme. Magazine Pesum Padam wrote, "Producer made the film with reformative intentions but the film leads to indiscipline only".
Upon the success of the movie Producer Kalaivanar NS Krishnan gifted  the writer M. karinanithi a car for celebrating the success.

References

External links

Bibliography
 

1951 films
1950s Tamil-language films
Films scored by C. R. Subbaraman
Indian drama films
Indian films based on plays
Films with screenplays by M. Karunanidhi
1951 drama films